Delvin Glenn "Del" Miller (July 15, 1913 – August 19, 1996) was a driver, trainer and owner in the sport of harness racing as well as an important  breeder after acquiring Adios to stand at his Meadow Lands Farm in Meadow Lands, Pennsylvania. During a career that spanned eight decades, Miller won major races in the United States as well as in France. He was the founder of The Meadows racetrack in Meadow Lands, Pennsylvania where in 1997 the Adios Pace was officially renamed the Delvin Miller Adios Pace to honor his memory.

Del Miller was inducted into the United States Harness Racing Hall of Fame in 1969. He died in 1996 and was interred in the Cross Creek Cemetery in Cross Creek, Pennsylvania.

References

1913 births
1996 deaths
American harness racers
United States Harness Racing Hall of Fame inductees
Sportspeople from California
Sportspeople from Pennsylvania